Geophis annuliferus, also known as the western snail-eating snake, is a snake of the colubrid family. It is endemic to Mexico.

References

Geophis
Snakes of North America
Endemic reptiles of Mexico
Taxa named by George Albert Boulenger
Reptiles described in 1894